Rock 'n' Roller Coaster Starring Aerosmith is an enclosed, launched roller coaster located at Disney's Hollywood Studios within Walt Disney World. Manufactured by Vekoma, the roller coaster opened to the public on July 29, 1999. Riders experience up to 5 Gs and travel through three inversions, which include a sea serpent roll and a corkscrew. The attraction also features recorded music as well as appearances from the well-known rock band Aerosmith. 

A second installation with an identical track layout opened as Rock 'n' Roller Coaster avec Aerosmith at Walt Disney Studios Park within Disneyland Paris on March 16, 2002. It closed in September 2, 2019 and was replaced with Avengers Assemble: Flight Force, as part of the new Avengers Campus Paris themed land.

History
In April 1998, Disney-MGM Studios (later named Disney's Hollywood Studios) announced that they would be adding Rock 'n' Roller Coaster. The ride was set to open in 1999 for the park's tenth anniversary. The park hired Vekoma to build the launched indoor roller coaster, and construction began two months prior to the announcement in February 1998. The track layout was completed by June 1998.

Soft opening cast member previews began in June 1999. The following month, the attraction held its grand opening on July 29 with a special, invitation-only party featuring Aerosmith as the guests of honor. Winners were taken to the park, in stretch limousines and received complimentary meals. After a special performance by painter Denny Dent, winners received the chance to ride the roller coaster with one of the Aerosmith band members. A picture from the special event is on display near the exit of the ride.

In each train, there are a total of 120 speakers. There are five surrounding each rider, consisting of two mid-range speakers, two tweeters, and a subwoofer placed under the seat. The Walt Disney Studios Park version of the ride opened on March 16, 2002. It featured the same track layout as the Walt Disney World installation, but the theme and line queue were different. In 2007, the queue was modified to accommodate single riders in addition to FASTPASS.

On December 17, 2015, the Hollywood Studios location hosted a special event to promote the release of Star Wars: The Force Awakens. The queue line featured Star Wars movie posters, the Aerosmith pre-show was disabled and the speakers played music from the film. The same Star Wars overlay also occurred on April 14, 2017.

In 2017, the Hollywood Studios location received new television screens mounted in spaces prior to the boarding area. They show loading and safety tips in an effort to reduce boarding time. In addition, the exterior of the main ride building was given a new coat of paint.

It was announced at the 2018 D23 Expo in Japan that the Walt Disney Studios Park location would be closing for a complete theme change to the Iron Man and Avengers franchises of the Marvel Cinematic Universe. After more than 18 years of operation, the attraction officially closed on September 2, 2019 and was replaced by Avengers Assemble: Flight Force on July 20, 2022, as part of the new Avengers Campus Paris themed land.

Ride experience
The pre-show of the attraction was modified over time. The most recent version features band member Joe Perry asking Chris, the Disney cast member in the pre-show, to grab his black Les Paul guitar. The cast member in the pre-show area then proceeds to pick up and remove a black guitar signed by Joe Perry from the set. The pre-show film also includes a roadie saying "Hey Joe, I'll get it for ya" in the background as a backup, in the event that a cast member is not available to participate.

Queue

Disney's Hollywood Studios
As guests enter the line queue, they walk into a high-ceilinged circular room themed to a fictional record label called G-Force Records. Walls are decorated with ceiling-high guitars and digital posters of Hollywood Records artists, and the floor depicts a giant record. These digital posters sometimes display guests' names as recording artists, accomplished by short-range RFID scanners that read their MagicBands. Also on display to guests is a small exhibit of recording instruments in the stand-by queue.

As part of the pre-show experience, guests are asked to wait outside the doors of Studio C. Different musical instruments can be heard being played in Studio B during a rehearsal. As guests enter Studio C, Aerosmith is working on an instrumental recording of "Walk This Way" with a sound engineer. The band greets the guests as their manager walks in interrupting, telling the band they're running late to a scheduled show. As the band gets ready to depart, Steven Tyler stops and says they can't leave the guests behind. Joe Perry and the rest of the band agree, as the manager sarcastically replies, "Well, guys, what do you expect me to do? Send them all with you?" Steven pauses and says, "Wait a minute. I love that idea. How about some backstage passes?" The manager reluctantly agrees and makes a phone call ordering a "super stretch" limo, calling it a "really fast car" that will take everyone across town to the show. The limo that Aerosmith boarded in the background peels out, leaving their manager behind to her disappointment. As the scene ends, "Walk This Way" resumes playing but this time with vocals. Guests are permitted to exit the pre-show area and board the ride.

Walt Disney Studios Park
The former Paris version was similar, except guests entered a building themed to the fictional Tour de Force Records. The story focused on Aerosmith, working with engineers, creating a revolutionary new music experience at the Tour De Force Records studios. After watching the pre-show which features Aerosmith's Steven Tyler hyping up the ride, guests were lured into the testing area where they boarded one of five Soundtrackers, the prototype vehicles for the new experience.

On-ride
As the ride vehicle leaves the boarding station, Bill St. James, the radio DJ for LA's Classic Rock Station, begins a short commentary, usually followed by a traffic report in the surrounding area where Aerosmith's concert is taking place. The limo stops in front of a highway tunnel where a highway sign flashes humorous messages like: "Traffic bug you? Then STEP on it!". (In the Paris version, instead of guests being taken on the Los Angeles freeways, the Paris version is based around an Aerosmith music video.) As the limo enters the tunnel the on-ride photo is taken and a selection of Aerosmith songs play.

After a long straightway, the limo proceeds to do a sea serpent roll, which is a two inversion element, and then some less intense over-banked turns. During the ride, there are neon signs on the side of the track, designed to mimic road signs; in the Paris version, lighting rigs, projectors, strobes, and smoke effects are used in place of the road signs that exist in the U.S. version. The limo continues along the track, until it reaches the third and final inversion, a corkscrew, and ending the ride with more banked turns as well as a camelback hill. The limo proceeds to the VIP backstage area, where guests exit through the red carpet towards the on-ride photo screens at the gift shop.

Soundtrack

Disney's Hollywood Studios
Walt Disney Imagineering worked with Aerosmith to produce a special soundtrack for the roller coaster. Each coaster train features different Aerosmith songs, some containing some new lyrics written specifically for the attraction; for example, "Love in an Elevator" is sung as "Love in a roller coaster".

 License plates and songs heard on each car:
 1QKLIMO: "Nine Lives"
 UGOBABE: "Love in an Elevator" and "Walk This Way"
 BUHBYE: "Young Lust", "F.I.N.E.*" and "Love in an Elevator" (Sung as Love in a Rollercoaster in the last line)
 H8TRFFC: "Back in the Saddle" and "Dude (Looks Like a Lady)"
 2FAST4U: "Sweet Emotion" (live, as featured in A Little South of Sanity)
 There is an unused song that is only used during testing and maintenance known as "What Kind of Love Are You On" (Sung as What Kind of Ride Are You On in the last line)

There is a 6th limo in the fleet that has no license plate and is always "in refurbishment." The vehicles are rotated in and out of use after a period of many thousands of laps around the track. However, the maintenance teams will switch out the plate and add the proper song to the new vehicle every time a rotation is made. 

In addition, prior to the 2007 refurbishment:
The ride featured Uncle Joe Benson, a well-known Los Angeles rock radio DJ, as the station's DJ. Bill St. James, former host of ABC Radio's Flashback, currently provides his own voice as the DJ of "LA's Classic Rock Station."
The UGOBABE license plate used UGOGIRL.
Steven Tyler displayed the Shocker gesture when agreeing to offer backstage passes.
The "Chris" that Joe Perry asked to grabbed the black Les Paul was portrayed by a cast member who took a black Les Paul off of the recording studio set.
Only the UGOGIRL and BUHBYE limos had actual countdowns (this is evident by Steven Tyler having commentary while counting down when it was added to the other limos).

Walt Disney Studios Park
The vehicles in Paris were called "Soundtrackers" instead of limousines. A unique aspect of the Walt Disney Studios version is that each Soundtracker had its own theme. There were five different lightshows and five different soundtracks, one for each Soundtracker. The themes were as follows:

 Soundtracker 1: green lightshow theme; played "Back In The Saddle" and "Dude Looks Like A Lady".
 Soundtracker 2: purple lightshow theme; played "Young Lust," "F.I.N.E." and "Love In An Elevator."
 Soundtracker 3: multicolour lightshow theme; played "Love In An Elevator" and "Walk This Way."
 Soundtracker 4: red lightshow theme; played "Nine Lives."
 Soundtracker 5: blue lightshow theme; played "Sweet Emotion (live)."

See also
Aerosmith
List of incidents at Walt Disney World

References

External links
 Official Disney's Hollywood Studios Rock 'n' Roller Coaster website
 Official Walt Disney Studios Park Avengers Assemble: Flight Force website
 Photos Magiques - Rock 'n' Roller Coaster avec Aerosmith

1999 establishments in Florida
2002 establishments in France
2019 disestablishments in France
Aerosmith
Avengers Campus
Backlot (Walt Disney Studios Park)
Disney's Hollywood Studios
Enclosed roller coasters
Former Walt Disney Parks and Resorts attractions
Licensed properties at Walt Disney Parks & Resorts
Roller coasters at Disney's Hollywood Studios
Roller coasters at Walt Disney Studios Park
Sunset Boulevard (Disney's Hollywood Studios)
Walt Disney Parks and Resorts attractions
Walt Disney Studios Park